Concours may refer to:

 Concours d'Elegance, a competition among car owners on the appearance of their cars
 EU Concours, a selection process for staff of the EU institutions
 A competitive examination
 Cadillac Concours, an automobile model
 Kawasaki Concours, a 1,000 cc sport touring motorcycle made by Kawasaki Motors
 Kawasaki 1400GTR, also known as the Concours 14, a 1,400 cc successor to the Concours

See also
 Concourse (disambiguation)